New York's 89th State Assembly District is located in the southern part of the State of New York in the United States.  District 89 is north of New York City in Westchester County, New York and is composed of the City of Mount Vernon, New York as well as Yonkers, New York. It is encompassed by New York's 34th State Senate district, New York's 35th State Senate district, New York's 36th State Senate district, New York's 37th State Senate district, and New York's 16th congressional district

District 89 is currently represented by Democrat J. Gary Pretlow.

Recent election results

2022

2020

2018

2016

2014

2012

Representatives

References 

89
Westchester County, New York